Devaris "Dee" Strange-Gordon (born April 22, 1988), formerly known as Dee Gordon,  is an American professional baseball second baseman, shortstop, and center fielder who is currently a free agent. He has played Major League Baseball (MLB) for the Los Angeles Dodgers, Miami Marlins, Seattle Mariners, and Washington Nationals.

Strange-Gordon debuted in MLB with the Dodgers in 2011. He was primarily a shortstop and second baseman, and with the Marlins, he was primarily a second baseman. He began his tenure with the Mariners by playing center field in 2018, and started playing left field in 2020. In 2015, in his first season with the Marlins, Strange-Gordon hit .333 with a total of 205 hits and stole 58 bases. He led the NL in all three categories and became the first player to lead the National League in both batting average and stolen bases since fellow second baseman Jackie Robinson in 1949. Through the 2010s, Strange-Gordon stole 330 bases, the most of any player.

Early life
Strange-Gordon was born in Windermere, Florida, the son of former Major League Baseball (MLB) pitcher Tom Gordon and Devona Denise Strange. His parents were high-school sweethearts but did not marry; Tom had relationships with three other women as well and had a total of five children, all in Florida. Dee is his second-oldest. When Dee was seven years old in 1995, his mother Devona was shot to death by a subsequent boyfriend who claimed that she was shot as they played with a loaded gun. The boyfriend pleaded no contest to manslaughter and was sentenced to five years in prison. Tom Gordon sued for custody of Dee and raised him with the help of his own mother, Dee's grandmother.

Strange-Gordon's full name is Devaris Strange-Gordon. Friends and family call him Varis. He was known professionally by his full name until 2008 when a Missoula Osprey public address announcer mispronounced his first and last names. He thereafter chose to be known professionally simply as Dee Gordon. In 2020, he stated that he would like to return to being known by his legal surname professionally, to honor his mother.

Baseball career

Amateur career
Though his father was a baseball player, Strange-Gordon initially focused on basketball and did not play baseball until he was in high school. He received a scholarship offer to play college basketball for the Louisville Cardinals.

Gordon played baseball at Avon Park High School (like his father), Seminole Community College, and Southeastern University, all in central Florida. He was drafted by the Los Angeles Dodgers in the fourth round of the 2008 Major League Baseball Draft.

Minor leagues
In 2008, with the Ogden Raptors of the Pioneer League, he hit .331 in 60 games. With the Great Lakes Loons in 2009, Gordon hit .301 and stole 73 bases. He appeared in the Midwest League All-Star Game, was named the league's Most Valuable Player, selected to its mid-season and post-season All-Star teams, and chosen for the Prospect of the Year Award. The Dodgers also selected him as their "Minor League Player of the Year".

In 2010, he was with the Chattanooga Lookouts in the Double-A Southern League and was selected to represent the Lookouts in the All-Star game but was unable to play because he was also selected to the All-Star Futures Game. He hit .277 in 133 games in 2010, while stealing 53 bases and committing 37 errors. He played for Gigantes de Carolina in the Puerto Rico Baseball League after the season. He was assigned to the AAA Albuquerque Isotopes at the start of 2011.

Los Angeles Dodgers

At the start of 2011, Gordon was the Dodgers' best prospect according to Baseball America. After an injury to shortstop Rafael Furcal, the Dodgers purchased Gordon's contract on June 6, 2011, and he made his major league debut in the top of the ninth as a pinch runner against the Philadelphia Phillies that night, and scored a run. His father was in attendance. The next day, in his first start, he had hits in his first three major league at bats and had a stolen base. In a game against the Los Angeles Angels of Anaheim on July 1, Gordon stole second, third, and home in the same inning. He became the first Dodger player since Harvey Hendrick in 1928 and the first Major Leaguer since Jayson Werth on May 12, 2009 to accomplish that feat. Gordon appeared in 56 games for the Dodgers, hitting .304 with 24 stolen bases. He also stole 30 bases for the Isotopes, giving him a total of 54 between the majors and the minors in 2011. In just 56 games for the Dodgers, Gordon's 24 stolen bases were tied for the most by a rookie during the 2011 season. He was selected to the Topps All-Star Rookie team.

Gordon hit his first career home run on May 1, 2012, leading off the game against Jhoulys Chacín of the Colorado Rockies. On June 1, 2012, Gordon was part of a Dodgers lineup that featured the sons of five former Major Leaguers (along with Tony Gwynn Jr., Iván DeJesús Jr., Jerry Hairston Jr. and Scott Van Slyke). This was the first time in Major League history that this had occurred. It was also the first time a starting infield of four major league sons had ever occurred: first baseman Van Slyke, second baseman Hairston, third baseman De Jesus and shortstop Gordon. Gordon was leading the league in stolen bases when he tore the UCL in his right thumb on a successful steal of third base on July 4 against the Cincinnati Reds. He did not rejoin the club until September 11, by which time the club had acquired Hanley Ramírez to play shortstop. With his starting spot gone, Gordon was relegated to a pinch running role the remainder of the season. Overall, in 2012, he played in 87 games and hit .228 with 32 steals. After the season, he played for the Tigres del Licey in the Dominican Winter League.

He began 2013 back in AAA with the Isotopes and was called up to the Dodgers on May 4 after an injury to Ramírez. He played in 19 games, during which he hit a poor .175, and was optioned back to AAA. He rejoined the Dodgers late in the season and was used primarily as a pinch runner. He stole 10 bases in 12 attempts for the Dodgers in 2013 while hitting .231 in 38 games. Later in the season, the Isotopes started playing Gordon at second base and he played center field in the Dominican Winter League in an attempt to improve his versatility.

Gordon beat out Alex Guerrero to become the Dodgers starting second baseman for the 2014 season. He hit .301 in the first half of the season, while leading the league in triples (9) and steals (42) and he was selected to the National League squad at the 2014 Major League Baseball All-Star Game. At the All-Star game at Target Field, when Gordon was in the on-deck circle, Derek Jeter told Fox TV commentators how amazing it was to see Dee there, also playing as an All-Star, having first met him at age 15 when his father Tom was then pitching for the Yankees. Gordon had entered the game as a pinch-runner in the fourth inning, and scored the game-tying run. Overall, he went 0–1, but made a strong fielding play at second base, sliding to his right to grab a ground ball to end the sixth inning.

Gordon finished the 2014 season with 64 stolen bases, the most in Major League Baseball. It was the first time a Dodgers player had led the Major League in stolen bases since Davey Lopes stole 77 bases in 1975. He hit .289 in over 600 at-bats and also led the league with 12 triples. He was selected as a Sporting News National League all-star.

Miami Marlins

On December 10, 2014, Gordon was traded to the Miami Marlins, along with Dan Haren and Miguel Rojas, in exchange for Andrew Heaney, Chris Hatcher, Austin Barnes, and Enrique Hernández. Gordon recorded his 50th hit of the season in the Marlins' 28th game on May 7, 2015, tying Rogers Hornsby's 1924 Major League record for fewest team games required to reach 50 hits. After 28 games, Gordon led the major leagues with a .437 batting average. On May 22, Gordon stole four bases in a game against the Baltimore Orioles. In a June 30 home game against the San Francisco Giants, Gordon hit his first inside-the-park home run. The home run against pitcher Ryan Vogelsong scored three runs. It was also the first inside-the-park homer at Marlins Park. Gordon batted .333 for the season, winning the National League batting title and leading the majors in infield hits (36) and bunt hits (16), and winning his first Rawlings Gold Glove Award.

On January 18, 2016, Gordon signed a five-year contract extension with the Marlins worth $50 million. On April 29, Major League Baseball suspended Gordon for 80 games due to performance-enhancing drugs use. He tested positive for exogenous testosterone and clostebol.

On September 26, the day after teammate and friend José Fernández died in a boating accident, Gordon led off the game versus the Mets. A left handed hitter, he took the first pitch of his at bat as a right-handed batter, imitating Fernández's batting stance, with Fernández's batting helmet in honor of his late friend; pitcher Bartolo Colon, out of respect, threw the pitch for a ball. Gordon then switched to bat left handed as he does naturally and, following a second ball, Colon threw a fastball down the middle of the strikezone, which Gordon hit for his first home run of the year. He rounded the bases fighting off tears and hugged teammates upon his arrival back to the dugout. He said after the game that he had never hit a ball that far even in batting practice, adding, "If y'all don't believe in God, y'all might as well start. For that to happen today, we had some help." Gordon's tribute home run to Fernández has been described as a "transcendent MLB moment."

In 2016 he batted .268/.305/.335 with one home run. For the season, he had the highest ground ball percentage (57.6%), and the lowest fly ball percentage (19.6%), of all major league hitters.

In 2017, he batted .308/.341/.375 with two home runs, and led the majors in bunt hits, with 18.

Seattle Mariners
On December 7, 2017, the Marlins traded Gordon and international slot money to the Seattle Mariners for Nick Neidert, Christopher Torres, and Robert Dugger. It was also reported that Gordon would be an outfielder for the Mariners. Gordon played outfield for the Mariners until Robinson Canó was suspended for 80 games, at which point Gordon returned to second base.

In September 2018, a day after Gordon nonchalantly dropped a fly ball in the outfield, he was criticized by and fought teammate Jean Segura in the team's locker room after asking media to leave the room. For the 2018 season Gordon batted .268/.288/.349 with four home runs in 556 at bats. Center fielders set up on average only 302 feet from home plate when he came to bat and left fielders 267 feet from home plate, closer than for any other major league hitter. While he stole 30 bases (fifth in the league), he led the American League with 12 times caught stealing. On defense his 10 errors at second base were third among all AL second basemen, and his .963 fielding percentage in center field was the lowest among all major league center fielders with at least 400 innings played. Gordon walked in 1.5% of his at bats, the lowest percentage in the major leagues, and had the lowest walks-per-strikeout ratio in the majors (0.11).

In 2019, Gordon batted .275/.304/.359 and stole 22 bases in 117 games.

In 2020, he batted .200/.268/.213 and stole three bases in 33 games. As a utility player, he split time equally between second base and left field (13 games each), with three appearances at shortstop, and served as a pinch runner in seven games. He had the fastest average time from home plate to first base of all major league second basemen, at 4.18 seconds.

On October 27, 2020, it was reported that the Mariners would not pick up Strange-Gordon's $14 million contract option for the  season, instead paying him a $1 million buyout. The following day, the Mariners officially declined his option, making him a free agent.

Cincinnati Reds
On February 7, 2021, Strange-Gordon signed a minor league contract with the Cincinnati Reds organization. On March 26, 2021, Strange-Gordon was released by the Reds.

Milwaukee Brewers
On April 8, 2021, Strange-Gordon signed a minor league contract with the Milwaukee Brewers organization. He hit .333 with 1 home run in 10 games for the Triple-A Nashville Sounds before being released by Milwaukee on May 22.

Chicago Cubs
On May 26, 2021, Strange-Gordon signed a minor league contract with the Chicago Cubs organization and was assigned to the Triple-A Iowa Cubs. In 27 games with Iowa, he batted .223/.270/.310 with 1 home run and 9 RBI. On July 6, Strange-Gordon opted out of his minor league deal and elected free agency.

Pittsburgh Pirates
On July 7, 2021, Strange-Gordon signed a minor league contract with the Pittsburgh Pirates organization.
On August 1, Strange-Gordon opted out of his contract.

Washington Nationals
On December 11, 2021, Strange-Gordon signed a minor league contract with the Washington Nationals organization. On April 7, 2022, the Nationals selected Strange-Gordon's contract, adding him to their opening day roster as a result of his strong play during spring training. On April 12, 2022, Strange-Gordon made his first career MLB appearance as a pitcher in the 8th inning of a 16-4 loss to the Atlanta Braves.

The Nationals designated Strange-Gordon for assignment on June 14, 2022. He was released on June 19; at the time he was batting .305 with a .661 OPS. He was re-signed on July 16 to a minor league contract. He was released on August 5, 2022.

Personal life

Dee's half-brother, Nick Gordon, was drafted by the Minnesota Twins in the first round (#5) of the 2014 draft.

Gordon is involved with many charities, such as Above .500 Inc. where he hosted Meet & Greets and participated in multiple charity games. In addition, Gordon created "Flash of Hope", a charity to help children whose parent died as a result of domestic abuse. Working with the Florida District Attorney's office, he invites one child a month to join him in the clubhouse and during batting practice.

In 2017, Gordon was the Marlins nominee for the Roberto Clemente Award after his work with Athletes Brand and Food for the Hungry in their efforts to end poverty in the Dominican Republic.

In 2020, he announced that he was going back to using his full last name, Strange-Gordon, to honor his late mother.

See also

List of Major League Baseball batting champions
List of Major League Baseball annual stolen base leaders
List of Silver Slugger Award winners at second base
List of Gold Glove Award winners at second base
List of second-generation Major League Baseball players
List of Major League Baseball players suspended for performance-enhancing drugs

References

External links

 

1988 births
Living people
African-American baseball players
Gold Glove Award winners
Major League Baseball second basemen
Major League Baseball shortstops
Major League Baseball center fielders
Major League Baseball players suspended for drug offenses
American sportspeople in doping cases
National League All-Stars
National League batting champions
National League stolen base champions
Silver Slugger Award winners
Los Angeles Dodgers players
Miami Marlins players
Seattle Mariners players
Washington Nationals players
Seminole State Raiders baseball players
Gigantes de Carolina players
Tigres del Licey players
American expatriate baseball players in the Dominican Republic
Indios de Mayagüez players
Ogden Raptors players
Great Lakes Loons players
Chattanooga Lookouts players
Albuquerque Isotopes players
Rancho Cucamonga Quakes players
Jupiter Hammerheads players
Tacoma Rainiers players
Baseball players from Florida
People from Windermere, Florida
Nashville Sounds players
Iowa Cubs players
21st-century African-American sportspeople
20th-century African-American people
Indianapolis Indians players